Beaver Hunt is a pornographic magazine aimed at men and published in the United States. It was first published in 1979 by Larry Flynt. It was an offshoot of Hustler magazines's popular running feature, "Beaver Hunt", which first appeared in the July 1976 issue of Hustler magazine. The feature became so popular that Larry Flynt decided to create a magazine highlighting only reader-submitted photos.

Though the title of the magazine has changed somewhat over the years (Hustler Beaver Hunt, The Best of Hustler Beaver Hunt, Hustler Best of Beaver Hunt), several times a year LFP Publishes Best of Beaver Hunt featuring standout pictorials previously seen in the pages of Hustler.

Publisher
Beaver Hunt is officially published by LFP, Inc, which is controlled by Flynt.  "L.F.P." is the abbreviation for "Larry Flynt Publications."

Related magazines
LFP, Inc. publishes several other magazines that use the Hustler brand:
 Hustler's Taboo, which specializes in fetishistic material, such as the depiction of sexual bondage and urolagnia.
 Barely Legal, a primarily softcore magazine focusing on models between 18 and 23
 Asian Fever, focusing on Asian models
 Hustler XXX, a more generic hardcore offering

Websites
The LFP Internet Group, LLC, operates BeaverHunt.com and a number of related sites, where it sells pictures and videos with content similar to that in its magazines.

See also

 Hustler World
 Pubic Wars
 List of men's magazines
 List of pornographic magazines

External links 
 

Pornographic magazines published in the United States
Men's magazines published in the United States
Larry Flynt Publications
Magazines established in 1979
Pornographic men's magazines
Magazines published in California